Vahdatiyeh (also Romanized as Vaḩdattīyeh) is a city in Sadabad District of Dashtestan County, Bushehr province, Iran. At the 2006 census, its population was 11,023 in 2,250 households. The following census in 2011 counted 11,414 people in 2,956 households. The latest census in 2016 showed a population of 11,222 people in 3,162 households.

References 

Cities in Bushehr Province
Populated places in Dashtestan County